Members of the New South Wales Legislative Council between 1952 and 1955 were indirectly elected by a joint sitting of the New South Wales Parliament, with 15 members elected every three years. The most recent election was on 26 November 1954, with the term of new members commencing on 23 April 1955. The President was William Dickson.

See also
Second Cahill ministry
Third Cahill ministry

References

Members of New South Wales parliaments by term
20th-century Australian politicians